The 2020 Valencian Community motorcycle Grand Prix (officially known as the Gran Premio Motul de la Comunitat Valenciana) was the fourteenth round of the 2020 Grand Prix motorcycle racing season and the thirteenth round of the 2020 MotoGP World Championship. It was held at the Circuit Ricardo Tormo in Valencia on 15 November 2020.

The race was won by Franco Morbidelli, whilst Joan Mir claimed the premier class title after securing seventh place with just 0.026s ahead of Ducati's Andrea Dovizioso. It was Mir's first premier class title in his career and his second championship overall after previously winning the 2017 Moto3 World Championship, which also made him the first Moto3 World Champion to win the premier class title since the introduction of the Moto3 category in 2012. This success also marked the first rider's title for Suzuki since Kenny Roberts Jr. in 2000 and the maiden teams' championship title for the Japanese manufacturer respectively.

Background

Impact of the COVID-19 pandemic 

The opening rounds of the 2020 championship have been heavily affected by the COVID-19 pandemic. The Valencian Community Grand Prix, scheduled in the original calendar on November 15 as the twentieth and final stage of the season, was postponed by one week for the initial shift of the Grand Prix of the Americas (later cancelled on July 8) to the third Sunday in November (it was scheduled for April 5 as the third race of the championship). After the postponement of the Argentine Grand Prix (initially classified as the fourth Grand Prix of the season on April 19) to November 22, the Valencia stage was moved back by another week (the Argentine race was later cancelled on July 31). Several Grands Prix were cancelled or postponed after the opening round in Qatar was halted, prompting the Fédération Internationale de Motocyclisme to draft a new calendar. A new calendar based exclusively in Europe was announced on 11 June. The Valencian Community Grand Prix is classified as the fourteenth Grand Prix of the new calendar (the thirteenth for the MotoGP class) on November 15, as planned in the original one. It is preceded by the introduction of the European Grand Prix, which is also held on the Ricardo Tormo Circuit, after the organizers of the Valencian Community Grand Prix signed a contract with Dorna Sports, owner of the sport's commercial rights, to host a double grand prix in the Valencia circuit. With the inclusion of the Portuguese Grand Prix, which will be held on 22 November at the Autódromo Internacional do Algarve as the last race of the season, this also marks that for the first time since 2001 the championship finale will not be held in Valencia.

MotoGP Championship standings before the race 
After the victory in the European Grand Prix, Joan Mir confirmed himself at the top of the drivers' classification with 162 points. Fabio Quartararo and Álex Rins are 37 points behind the leader, with the Frenchman second due to the victories won this season (3 vs 1) compared to the Spaniard, who nevertheless gained three positions in the overall standings. Maverick Viñales and Franco Morbidelli are fourth and fifth, with 121 and 117 points respectively.

In the constructors' standings, Suzuki climbs to the top of the standings with 181 points, overtaking Ducati (now at 181 points). Yamaha is third with 163 points, just 4 points ahead of KTM. Honda is fifth at 130 points, while Aprilia closes the standings at 36 points.

In the team championship standings, Team Suzuki Ecstar is confirmed first at 287, increasing its lead by 82 points over Petronas Yamaha SRT. Ducati Team and KTM Factory Racing are third and fourth with 194 and 182 points respectively, with Monster Energy Yamaha fifth at 159 points.

MotoGP entrants 

 Stefan Bradl replaced Marc Márquez for the eleventh straight race while the latter recovered from injuries sustained in his opening round crash.
 Iker Lecuona, after missing the Valencian Community Grand Prix due to Andorran quarantine rules, as his brother and assistant had tested positive for the SARS-CoV-2 virus, was entered into the event and was due to compete from Saturday practice onwards; however, he tested positive on entry to the paddock and was subsequently withdrawn.

Free practice

MotoGP 
The first session ended with Takaaki Nakagami in the lead ahead of Franco Morbidelli and Maverick Viñales. In the second, Jack Miller was the fastest ahead of Nakagami and Francesco Bagnaia. In the third Morbidelli took the lead, followed by Pol Espargaró and Johann Zarco.

Combined Free Practice 1-2-3 
The top ten riders (written in bold) qualified in Q2.

Notes
  – Valentino Rossi and Álex Márquez set identical times in FP2; Valentino Rossi was classified ahead as he set his lap time before Álex Márquez.

Personal Best lap

In the fourth session Álex Rins was the fastest ahead of Nakagami and Zarco.

Qualifying

MotoGP

Warm up

MotoGP 
In the warm up, Franco Morbidelli was the fastest ahead of Pol Espargaró and Takaaki Nakagami.

Race

MotoGP

Moto2

Moto3

 Filip Salač suffered a chest injury in a crash during practice and was declared unfit to compete.

Championship standings after the race
Below are the standings for the top five riders, constructors, and teams after the round.

MotoGP

Riders' Championship standings

Constructors' Championship standings

Teams' Championship standings

Moto2

Riders' Championship standings

Constructors' Championship standings

Teams' Championship standings

Moto3

Riders' Championship standings

Constructors' Championship standings

Teams' Championship standings

Notes

References

External links

Valencia
Valencian Community motorcycle Grand Prix
Valencian Community motorcycle Grand Prix
21st century in Valencia
Valencian Community motorcycle Grand Prix